José Edison Mandarino (born March 26, 1941) is a former tennis player from Brazil.

Mandarino was born in Jaguarão. He reached the junior finals of the 1959 French Championships, defeated by German Ingo Buding. He played 109 matches for Brazil in the Davis Cup and is considered one of the players with more appearances in this event. He won 68 (41 at singles and 27 at doubles) and lost 41 (31 at singles and 10 at doubles). In doubles, he played with Thomaz Koch as well as Carlos Fernandes.

After his successful career as a player, he coached the Spanish Davis Cup team.

Mandarino achieved a career-high singles ranking of world No. 81 which he reached on June 2, 1975 after losing to Anatoli Volkov at the French Open. This ranking was achieved at the end of his career with the start of the open era. However he was one of the top world players before an official ranking came out.

External links
 
 
 

1941 births
Brazilian male tennis players
Living people
People from Jaguarão
Tennis players at the 1967 Pan American Games
Pan American Games medalists in tennis
Pan American Games gold medalists for Brazil
Sportspeople from Rio Grande do Sul
21st-century Brazilian people
20th-century Brazilian people